Senator Gale may refer to:

George Gale (Wisconsin politician) (1816–1868), Wisconsin State Senate
Levin Gale (1784–1834), Maryland State Senate